The World Journal for Pediatric and Congenital Heart Surgery is a bimonthly peer-reviewed medical journal covering the field of cardiovascular surgery in pediatrics. The editor-in-chief is Marshall Jacobs (Johns Hopkins School of Medicine). The journal was established in 2010 and is published by SAGE Publications and is an official journal of the World Society for Pediatric and Congenital Heart Surgery, the Congenital Heart Surgeons' Society, and the European Congenital Heart Surgeons Association.

Abstracting and indexing
The journal is abstracted and indexed in  MEDLINE, CINAHL, and ProQuest databases.

External links

SAGE Publishing academic journals
English-language journals
Pediatrics journals
Cardiology journals
Surgery journals